The 2022 Taipei Open (officially known as the Yonex Taipei Open 2022) was a badminton tournament which took place at Taipei Heping Basketball Gymnasium in Taipei, Taiwan, from 19 to 24 July 2022 and had a total purse of $500,000.

Hongkonger Ng Tsz Yau became the first player to win multiple categories in a single Taipei Open edition since American Tony Gunawan and Taiwanese Cheng Wen-hsing won the mixed doubles as a pair and their respective same-sex doubles finals in 2005.

Tournament
The 2022 Taipei Open was the fifteenth tournament of the 2022 BWF World Tour and also part of the Taipei Open championships, which had been held since 1980. This tournament was organized by the Chinese Taipei Badminton Association with sanction from the BWF.

Venue
This international tournament was held at Taipei Heping Basketball Gymnasium in Taipei, Taiwan.

Point distribution
Below is the point distribution table for each phase of the tournament based on the BWF points system for the BWF World Tour Super 300 event.

Prize pool 
The total prize money was US$500,000 with the distribution of the prize money in accordance with BWF regulations.

Men's singles

Seeds 

 Chou Tien-chen (champion)
 Wang Tzu-wei (quarter-finals)
 Parupalli Kashyap (quarter-finals)
 Kodai Naraoka (final)
 Chico Aura Dwi Wardoyo (withdrew)
 Koki Watanabe (second round)
 Khosit Phetpradab (quarter-finals)
 Misha Zilberman (first round)

Finals

Top half

Section 1

Section 2

Bottom half

Section 3

Section 4

Women's singles

Seeds 

 Tai Tzu-ying (champion)
 Michelle Li (withdrew)
 Beiwen Zhang (second round)
 Saina Nehwal (withdrew)
 Supanida Katethong (second round)
 Aya Ohori (first round)
 Saena Kawakami (final)
 Pai Yu-po (quarter-finals)

Finals

Top half

Section 1

Section 2

Bottom half

Section 3

Section 4

Men's doubles

Seeds 

 Lee Yang / Wang Chi-lin (final)
 Leo Rolly Carnando / Daniel Marthin (withdrew)
 Lu Ching-yao / Yang Po-han (second round)
 Lee Jhe-huei / Yang Po-hsuan (withdrew)
 Arjun M. R. / Dhruv Kapila (second round)
 Man Wei Chong / Tee Kai Wun (champions)
 Krishna Prasad Garaga / Vishnuvardhan Goud Panjala (first round)
 Goh V Shem / Lim Khim Wah (second round)

Finals

Top half

Section 1

Section 2

Bottom half

Section 3

Section 4

Women's doubles

Seeds 

 Anna Cheong / Teoh Mei Xing (withdrew)
 Yeung Nga Ting / Yeung Pui Lam (withdrew)
 Chang Ching-hui / Yang Ching-tun (second round)
 Febriana Dwipuji Kusuma / Amalia Cahaya Pratiwi (withdrew)
 Apriyani Rahayu / Siti Fadia Silva Ramadhanti (withdrew)
 Ng Tsz Yau / Tsang Hiu Yan (champions)
 Sayaka Hobara / Hinata Suzuki (semi-finals)
 Low Yeen Yuan / Valeree Siow (withdrew)

Finals

Top half

Section 1

Section 2

Bottom half

Section 3

Section 4

Mixed doubles

Seeds 

 Goh Soon Huat / Shevon Jemie Lai (withdrew)
 Rinov Rivaldy / Pitha Haningtyas Mentari (withdrew)
 Lee Jhe-huei / Hsu Ya-ching  (second round)
 Yang Po-hsuan / Hu Ling-fang (withdrew)
 Rehan Naufal Kusharjanto / Lisa Ayu Kusumawati (withdrew)
 Ishaan Bhatnagar / Tanisha Crasto (quarter-finals)
 Adham Hatem Elgamal / Doha Hany (withdrew)
 Zachariah Josiahno Sumanti / Hediana Julimarbela (withdrew)

Finals

Top half

Section 1

Section 2

Bottom half

Section 3

Section 4

References

External links 

Tournament Link
Official website

Chinese Taipei Open
Taipei Open
Taipei Open
Taipei Open